Boris Pakhomov (7 June 1931 – 18 March 2005) was a Soviet modern pentathlete.

References

1931 births
2005 deaths
Russian male modern pentathletes
World Modern Pentathlon Championships medalists